Minuscule 157 (in the Gregory-Aland numbering of New Testament manuscripts), ε 207 (in the von Soden numbering of New Testament manuscripts), is a Greek minuscule manuscript of the New Testament Gospels, on vellum. According to the colophon it is dated to the year 1122. Formerly the date was wrongly deciphered as 1128 (Gregory, Thompson). It has complex contents and full marginalia.

Description 

The manuscript is a codex (forerunner to the modern book), containing the complete text of the four Gospels on 325 parchment leaves (sized ). The text is written in one column per page, with 22 lines per page.

The text is divided according to the chapters (known as  / kephalaia), whose tables of contents are given before each Gospel (also known as  / kephalaia), chapter numbers in the margin of the pages, and their titles (known as  / titloi) at the top of the pages. There is no division according to the Eusebian Canons (an early system of dividing the four Gospels into different sections), though the Eusebian Canon tables are placed at the beginning.

It contains the Epistle to Carpian, prolegomena, lectionary equipment, subscriptions at the end of each Gospel, ornaments and pictures in vermilion and gold. The Gospel of John is preceded by a portrait of John the Evangelist with Prochorus.

It has the famous Jerusalem Colophon ("copied and corrected from the ancient manuscripts of Jerusalem preserved on the Holy Mountain"), at the end of each Gospel. According to biblical scholar Frederick H. A. Scrivener, it is very beautifully written.

Text 

Although the manuscript was made for the Byzantine Emperor, its text is not the standard Byzantine but a mixture of text-types with a strong Alexandrian element. The text-types are groups of different New Testament manuscripts which share specific or generally related readings, which then differ from each other group, and thus the conflicting readings can separate out the groups. These are then used to determine the original text as published; there are three main groups with names: Alexandrian, Western, and Byzantine. Its readings often agree with Codex Bezae (D), with some affinities to the Diatessaron, and to the Gnostic Heretic Marcion's text of Luke (see Gospel of Marcion).

Textual critic Hermann von Soden lists it among the group I (along with codices 235, 245, 291, 713, and 1012). Textual critic Kurt Aland placed it in Category III of his New Testament manuscript classification system. Category III manuscripts are described as having "a small but not a negligible proportion of early readings, with a considerable encroachment of [Byzantine] readings, and significant readings from other sources as yet unidentified."

According to the Claremont Profile Method (a specific analysis method of textual data), it represents K in Luke 1; in Luke 10 it is mixed with some relationship to the Alexandrian text; in Luke 20 it has the Alexandrian text.

In  it has an unusual ending to the Lord's Prayer: 
ὅτι σοῦ ἐστιν ἡ βασιλεία καὶ ἡ δύναμις καὶ ἡ δόξα, τοῦ πατρὸς καὶ τοῦ υἱοῦ καὶ τοῦ ἁγίου πνεύματος εἰς τοὺς αἰῶνας. ἀμήν (For thine is the kingdom and the power and the glory, of the Father and of the Son and of the Holy Spirit for ever. Amen.)
This ending is only found in two other manuscripts: Minuscule 225 and 418.

In  it reads: Ἰωσῆ (Joses); the reading is supported by the manuscripts 118 700* 1071 syr bo.

It does not include the text of Matthew 16:2b–3 or of the Pericope Adulterae (John 7:53-8:11).

History 
It was written in 1122 for the Byzantine Emperor John Porphyrogenitus (1118-1143). The manuscript belonged to the Ducal Library at Urbino, and was brought to Rome by Pope Clement VII (1523-1534).

In 1788 Andreas Birch made a facsimile of the manuscript. According to Birch, it is the most important manuscript of the New Testament except for Codex Vaticanus. It was examined by Scholz, and collated by Hoskier. C. R. Gregory saw it in 1886. Scrivener noted that this codex is often in agreement with codices Vaticanus (B), Bezae (D), Regius (L), 69, 106, and especially with 1.

It is currently housed at the Vatican Library (Urbinas gr. 2), in Rome.

See also 

 List of New Testament minuscules
 Biblical manuscript
 Textual criticism

References

Further reading 

 
 
 
 B. H. Streeter, "Codices 157, 1071 and the Caesarean Text", in Lake F/S (London, 1937), pp. 149–150. 
 Edward Maunde Thompson, An Introduction to Greek and Latin Paleography, p. 246, 248 (plate 68).

External links 

 Minuscule 157 at the Encyclopedia of Textual Criticism 
 Online images of minuscule 157 (Digital Microfilm) at the CSNTM.
 Online photographic images of minuscule 157 at the Vatican Digital Library.

Greek New Testament minuscules
12th-century biblical manuscripts
Manuscripts of the Vatican Library